Propellor Time is the seventeenth studio album by Robyn Hitchcock, the third and last recorded with The Venus 3 (Peter Buck of R.E.M., Scott McCaughey of Young Fresh Fellows and Bill Rieflin of Ministry and R.E.M.). It was released in 2010 via Yep Roc.

Additionally, an array of guest musicians collaborated with Hitchcock on Propellor Time; selected tracks feature contributions (some dating back to the Olé! Tarantula era) from John Paul Jones, Johnny Marr, Nick Lowe, and former Soft Boy/Egyptian bandmate Morris Windsor.

Different versions of "The Afterlight", "Luckiness" and "Sickie Boy" had appeared on previous releases.

Outtakes from the Propellor Time recording sessions are available on tracks 2, 5, 6  and 12 of the 2010 Hitchcock rarities compilation, Trolley Bus 2.

Track listing

Personnel 
Robyn Hitchcock & The Venus 3
 Robyn Hitchcock – lead vocals, guitar, harmonica, keyboards
 Peter Buck – 12-string electric guitar, 6-string acoustic guitar
 Scott McCaughey – bass, vocals
 Bill Rieflin – drums

Additional Musicians
 Chris Ballew – guitar, backing vocals, piano
 Charlie Francis – keyboards, mellotrons
 John Paul Jones – mandolin
 Nick Lowe – backing vocals
 Neil MacColl – banjo
 Johnny Marr – guitar
 Kate St John – oboe, treated accordion
 Morris Windsor – backing vocals
 Ruby Wright – musical saw

References

External links 

 Propellor Time robynhitchcock.com

Robyn Hitchcock albums
2010 albums
Yep Roc Records albums